Julio Cezar Rusch (born 22 June 1997), is a Brazilian professional footballer who plays as a defensive midfielder for Inter de Limeira.

Career
Rusch started his career in the Coritiba youth system. He played for the under-17 and under-19 teams. His professional debut came on 11 December 2016 against Ponte Preta. In 2017, he made it to the Brasileirão Sub-20 final.

References

1997 births
Living people
Brazilian footballers
Association football midfielders
Campeonato Brasileiro Série A players
Coritiba Foot Ball Club players
Figueirense FC players